Daniil Valentinovich Chayka (born October 22, 2002) is a Russian professional ice hockey defenceman who is currently assigned to the Henderson Silver Knights of the American Hockey League (AHL) as a prospect to the Vegas Golden Knights of the National Hockey League (NHL). Chayka was considered a top prospect for the 2021 NHL Entry Draft, and was selected 39th overall by the Vegas Golden Knights.

Playing career
Chayka won the OHL Cup as a member of the U16 Toronto Jr. Canadiens. Chayka was then drafted by the Guelph Storm and won the 2019 OHL championship. Due to the COVID-19 pandemic, Chayka returned to Russia, where he won the 2020 Karjala Cup. He was a member of the Russian 2020 World Junior team.

Career statistics

Regular season and playoffs

International

References

External links
 

2002 births
Living people
Guelph Storm players
HC CSKA Moscow players
Henderson Silver Knights players
Ice hockey people from Moscow
Krasnaya Armiya (MHL) players
Russian ice hockey defencemen
Vegas Golden Knights draft picks
Zvezda Moscow players